The 1982 Illinois Fighting Illini football team was an American football team that represented the University of Illinois at Urbana-Champaign during the 1982 Big Ten Conference football season. In their third year under head coach Mike White, the Illini compiled a 6–5 record, finished in fourth place in the Big Ten Conference, and lost to Alabama in the 1982 Liberty Bowl, which was Hall of Famer Bear Bryant's final game as Alabama's head coach.

The team's offensive leaders were quarterback Tony Eason with 3,248 passing yards, running back Dwight Beverly with 390 rushing yards, and wide receiver Mike Martin with 941 receiving yards. Eason was selected as the team's most valuable player.

Schedule

Roster

References

Illinois
Illinois Fighting Illini football seasons
Illinois Fighting Illini football